Kepler-12 is a star with a transiting planet Kepler-12b in a 4-day orbit.

Characteristics
Kepler-12, known also as KIC 11804465 in the Kepler Input Catalog, is an early G-type to late F-type star. This corresponds strongly with a sunlike dwarf star nearing the end of the main sequence, and is about to become a red giant. Kepler-12 is located approximately 900 parsecs (2,950 light years) away from Earth. The star also has an apparent magnitude of 13.438, which means that it cannot be seen from Earth with the unaided eye.

The star is slightly more massive, slightly more iron-rich and slightly hotter than the Sun. However, Kepler-12 is larger, with a radius of 1.483 times the Sun's radius.

Planetary system
The one currently known planet is a hot Jupiter with a radius 1.7 times that of Jupiter but less than half the mass.

References

Draco (constellation)
G-type main-sequence stars
Planetary systems with one confirmed planet
Planetary transit variables
20